Juliet Lee-Franzini (1933 – January 19, 2014) was Chinese-born physics who was the founding faculty member of the high energy physics experimental group at Stony Brook University.

Early life and education
Juliet Lee-Franzini was born of Chinese parents in Paris, France in 1933  and educated in the United States. She earned her BA at Hunter College in 1953, her MA and PhD from Columbia University in 1957 and 1960.

Career

From 1980 until 1981 she was a visiting professor of Physics at Cornell University. In 1991 Lee-Franzini took the position of VIP physicist at the Laboratori Nazionali di Frascati dell’INFN, until 1996. In 1996 she became the Director of Research at the Laboratori Nazionali di Frascati dell’INFN.

Professional board memberships

Lee-Franzini served on the Board of Directors of The Research Foundation of the State University of New York, from 1986 until 1991. She was on the executive committee of the Division of Particles and Fields at the American Physical Society from 1987 until 1989. From 1989 until 1991 she was on the nominating committee of the American Physical Society as well as serving on the nominating committee of the Division of Particles and Fields.

Research

Lee-Franzini conducted her research at many laboratories over her lifetime, often with her husband, Paolo Franzini. Her experiments in particle physics were conducted at Nevis Labs, Brookhaven National Laboratory, Penn-Princeton Accelerator, Fermilab, Cornell, and Frascati.

Her early experiments at Columbia investigated the quantities of muon decay spectra and also revealed accurate confirmation of the V-A nature of the weak interactive force.  She also studied the spectroscopy of bound state mesons, quark heavy flavor potentials, and the KLOE experiments at Frascati.

Honors

Juliet Lee-Franzini was a Fellow of the American Physical Society.

Personal life

In 1964 Juliet married fellow physicist Paolo Franzini, and together have a daughter named Paula.

References

1933 births
2014 deaths
American women physicists
Hunter College alumni
Columbia University alumni
20th-century American physicists
20th-century American women scientists
Fellows of the American Physical Society
21st-century American women